Melvin Olson (May 18, 1887 – July 18, 1962) was a member of the Wisconsin State Senate.

Olson was born in Blanchard, Wisconsin. He later moved to South Wayne, Wisconsin. Olson was a farmer, store owner, and a farm implement and supply dealer. He served on the high school board. Olson died in Monroe, Wisconsin.

Career
Olson was a member of the Senate representing the 17th district from 1943 to 1954. Additionally, he was Village President, Village Treasurer and Assessor of South Wayne, as well as a delegate to the 1948 Republican National Convention.

References

People from Lafayette County, Wisconsin
Businesspeople from Wisconsin
Farmers from Wisconsin
Mayors of places in Wisconsin
School board members in Wisconsin
Republican Party Wisconsin state senators
1887 births
1962 deaths
20th-century American politicians
People from South Wayne, Wisconsin
20th-century American businesspeople